Libru is a village in Agder county, Norway. The village is located on the border of the municipalities of Arendal and Froland.

References

Villages in Agder
Arendal
Froland